Oleg Nikolayevich Ostapenko (born 3 May 1957) is the former director of Roscosmos, the federal space agency, retired Colonel General in the Armed Forces of the Russian Federation, former Deputy Minister of Defence, and former commander of the Aerospace Defence Forces, a position he held from their foundation on 1 December 2011 until his promotion in November 2012. Prior to this he was commander of the Russian Space Forces from 2008, replacing Vladimir Popovkin.

Ostapenko joined the Soviet Strategic Rocket Forces in 1979 after graduating from the Felix Dzerzhinsky Military Academy, specialising in 'Strategic Missiles, Engines, and Production Equipment'. He undertook higher military studies, ending in 1992 and moved into the Ministry of Defence Space Units. He held a number of roles at Titov Main Test and Space Systems Control Centre ending with being Chief of Staff from 2002 to 2004.

In 2004, he was promoted to be First Deputy Chief of Staff of the Russian Space Forces and after undertaking a PhD in military sciences he became the commander of Plesetsk Cosmodrome in 2007. A year later on 30 June 2008 he was promoted to be commander of the Russian Space Forces replacing Vladimir Popovkin who became a Deputy Defence Minister. He was commander of the Aerospace Defence Forces from 1 December 2011 to 9 November 2012 and was promoted to the rank of Colonel General on 9 August 2012.

On 9 November 2012, he was appointed as a Deputy Minister of Defence and relieved of his command of the Aerospace Defence Forces.

On 10 October 2013, Ostanpenko was discharged from military service and relieved of his post in order to head Roscosmos, the federal space agency.

On 21 January 2015, Ostapenko was dismissed from Roscosmos.

Military education
General Ostapenko earned PhD in Military Sciences in 2007

 Graduated from F. Dzerzhinsky Military College, 1979
 Graduate from the Command Faculty of F. Dzerzhinsky Military College, 1992 
 Completed his specialty studies by graduating from the General Staff Academy of the Armed Forces of the Russian Federation, 2007

References

1957 births
Recipients of the Order of Military Merit (Russia)
Russian colonel generals
Living people
Military Academy of the General Staff of the Armed Forces of Russia alumni
Deputy Defence Ministers of Russia